R (Sainsbury’s Supermarkets Ltd) v Wolverhampton CC [2010] UKSC 20 is an English public law case involving invalid considerations of (factors considered by) a local council in making a compulsory purchase order. Judicial review was available and upheld in this case on one or more of four available grounds, namely: error of law, irrationality, serious procedural irregularity, and action for an improper purpose.

Facts
Wolverhampton City Council approved in principle a compulsory purchase order ("CPO") (under the Town and Country Planning Act 1990 section 226(1)(a)) of land owned by Sainsbury’s (its Raglan Street site) to facilitate  instead a competing proposed development for the site by Tesco. The Council took into account Tesco's commitment to contribute financially to public assets at an off-site ("Royal Hospital") site with no proven real connection in issuing its approval. 

Sainsbury’s contended to the court that it was illegitimate for Wolverhampton to have regard to Tesco’s monetary commitment involved with its regeneration of another site which bore no real connection with the site it wished to develop.  Wolverhampton and the second respondent, Tesco, contended that such a factor was inherently legitimate in the light of the scope of the established factors in statute and precedent once a first-stage evaluation fairly came down in its favour excluding that factor, leaving a second-stage ultimate choice between two rival developers for the site and a need to look at other factors, and so should at that hypothetical second stage be a valid factor to consider.

Judgment
Lord Collins gave the leading judgment. The court held that the council had taken into account an irrelevant factor in deciding whether to make a compulsory purchase order. It should not have considered the financial benefit from Tesco flowing into a site with "no real connection".

Lord Walker said the following.

Lady Hale said the following.

Lord Mance agreed.

Lord Phillips, Lord Hope and Lord Brown dissented.

See also

English public law
English land law

Notes

United Kingdom administrative case law
Wolverhampton
2010 in British law
2010 in case law
Supreme Court of the United Kingdom cases